Tilav Cirque is a cirque on the northwest side of McLean Buttress in The Fortress of the Cruzen Range, Victoria Land. It was named by the Advisory Committee on Antarctic Names in 2005 after Serap Z. Tilav, a US Antarctic Program field team member in support of the Antarctic Muon and Neutrino Detector Array (AMANDA) and cosmic-ray studies at the Amundsen–Scott South Pole Station for nine field seasons  between 1991 and 2005.

References

Landforms of Victoria Land
Cirques of Antarctica